Saraskana (Sl. No.: 27) is a Vidhan Sabha constituency of Mayurbhanj district, Odisha.

Area of this constituency includes Saraskana block, Bijatala block, Bisoi block and 3 GPs (Jaypur, Kusumi and Mayurdar) of Kusumi block.

In 2009 election,  Nationalist Congress Party candidate Rama Chandra Hansdah defeated Jharkhand Mukti Morcha candidate Dr. Budhan Murmu by a margin of 14,590 votes.

Elected Members
Three elections held from 2009 to 2019 in  Saraskana Vidhan Sabha constituency are:

2019: (27): Dr Budhan Murmu (BJD)
2014: (27): Bhadav Hansdah (BJD)
2009: (27): Rama Chandra Hansdah (NCP)

2019 Election Candidates

2014 Election Candidates

Summary of results of the 2009 Election

Notes

References

Assembly constituencies of Odisha
Politics of Mayurbhanj district